The Schaufelspitze is a mountain, in the Stubai Alps in the Austrian state of Tyrol.

Its summit is easily accessible to experienced mountaineers from the top station of the Stubai Glacier lift on the Schaufeljoch (also Isidornieder) at 3,158 m west of the peak. Other ascents are the North Arête (UIAA grade III) and the Northeast Arête (also grade III). The route taken by the first climbers was a grade II and ran from the Schaufelnieder (Fernaujoch), in the southeast, to the summit.

Literature

External links 

Alpine three-thousanders
Mountains of the Alps
Mountains of Tyrol (state)
Stubai Alps